Donn Óge Mag Oireachtaigh (died 1230) was the lord of Clann Taidg.

Biography

Mag Oireachtaigh had been dispossessed of his lands by King Aedh Ua Conchobair and to regain them enlisted the aid of King Aed Meith Ua Neill of Tír Eógain. This resulted in the deposition of King Aedh in 1225, and a war which great loss of life took place.

However, intervention by English allies of Aedh led to his restoration, with the result that Mag Oireachtaigh was forced to flee.

He was killed during an invasion of Connacht by Richard Mór de Burgh in 1230.

Annalistic references

The Annals of the Four Masters record the deaths of two of his sons:

 1260: Manus, the son of Hugh Mageraghty, was slain by Donnell O'Flahiff.
 1266: Dermot Roe, son of Conor, the son of Cormac Mac Dermot, and Donncahy, son of Donn Oge Mageraghty, were blinded by Hugh O'Conor.

Descendants

Anglicised Geraghty, descendants of the family are still found in large numbers in County Galway, County Mayo, County Roscommon, County Sligo and among the Irish diaspora.

See also
 War in Connacht (1225)
 Siege of Galway (1230)

References
 http://www.irishtimes.com/ancestor/surname/index.cfm?fuseaction=Go.&UserID=
 Irish Kings and High-Kings, Francis John Byrne (2001), Dublin: Four Courts Press, 
 CELT: Corpus of Electronic Texts at University College Cork

People from County Galway
People from County Roscommon
Medieval Gaels from Ireland
13th-century Irish people
Irish lords
1230 deaths